Boyton End is a hamlet in the Uttlesford district of Essex, England. It is located approximately one mile north-east of Thaxted on the B1051 road.

Hamlets in Essex
Thaxted